Viktor Ivanovich Dubinin (born 30 September 1901 in Moscow; died 25 April 1984 in Moscow) was a Soviet Russian football player and manager who had success coaching FC Dynamo Moscow.

Honours as a manager
 Soviet Top League champion with FC Dynamo Moscow: 1937.
 Soviet Cup winner with FC Dynamo Moscow: 1937.
 Soviet Top League silver with FC Dynamo Moscow: 1950.

References

External links
 

1901 births
Footballers from Moscow
1984 deaths
Soviet footballers
Soviet Top League players
FC Torpedo Moscow players
FC Dynamo Moscow players
Soviet football managers
FC Dynamo Moscow managers
Association football midfielders